Wabush Airport  is  northeast of Wabush, Newfoundland and Labrador, Canada. It serves Labrador West as well as Fermont, Quebec.

Airlines and destinations

See also
Wabush Water Aerodrome

References

External links

Certified airports in Newfoundland and Labrador
Labrador West